William Considine (29 July 1885 – 11 September 1959) was an Irish sportsperson. He played hurling with his local club Ennis Dalcassians and was a member of the Clare senior hurling team that won the All-Ireland Championship in 1914. His brothers, Brendan and Tull, also played with the Clare senior hurling team.

References

1885 births
1959 deaths
Ennis Dalcassians hurlers
Clare inter-county hurlers
All-Ireland Senior Hurling Championship winners